Khristo Poshtakov (b. September 22, 1944) is a Bulgarian short story author and novelist.

Biography
Khristo Poshtakov was born in Pavlikeni, a town in the northern central part of Bulgaria.

In 1974, he graduated from the Technical University of Sofia as a mechanical engineer. His later work occupations include acting as a technical advisor at the Ministry of Food Industry in Havana, Cuba, from 1979 till 1984; director of a holding company and later a bus company in Bulgaria; deputy-chairman of the Board of Directors of Balkan Pres AD Ltd. in Sofia.

Up to 1998, Poshtakov worked as a translator for the Sara Translation House in Sofia. He retired officially in 2008, but has kept producing translations and writing his own works.

He was the first chairman of the Bulgarian Fantastika Foundation, representing Bulgarian science fiction fandom worldwide.

Bibliography
Khristo Poshtakov's literary endeavours revolve mostly around hard science fiction. So far, he has had four novels and over 130 short stories published in various Bulgarian magazines, newspapers and anthologies. Some of his fiction and essays have been translated into English, Spanish, Russian, French, Dutch, Romanian, Greek, Italian, Hungarian and Portuguese and published in more than ten countries around the globe.

Notable publications in Bulgaria
 1993, „Дежурство на Титан“ (A Duty on Titan), a collection of short stories and novelettes
 1996, „Приключения в Дарвил“ (Adventures in Darville), a novel and short stories
 1997, „Нашествието на грухилите“ (The Gruchils' Invasion), a novel
 2003, „Меч, мощ и магия“ (Sword, Might and Magic), under the alias of Christopher Postman, a novel
 2004, „Генератор на реалности“ (Generator of Realities), a collection of short stories and novelettes
 2008, „Завладяването на Америка“ (The Conquest of America), a novel
 2011, „Инвазия“ (Invasion), a collection of short stories and novelettes

Notable translations
 2004, "Ce n'est que justice, Botkine!" (French translation of „Така е справедливо, Боткин!“, a short story), Utopiae 2004, France
 2005, „Меч, магия и челюсти“ (Russian translation of „Меч, мощ и магия“), Russia
 2006, Industria, luz y magia (Spanish translation of „Меч, мощ и магия“), Spain
 2006, La transformación (collection of short stories translated into Spanish), Spain
 2006, "Ten Thousand Dollars More" (English translation of „Още десет хиляди долара“, a novelette), Oceans of the Mind, USA
 2006, "Development of science fiction and fantasy in Bulgaria" (English translation of „Развитие на българската фантастика“, an overview), Phantazm (A Dutch e-zine), Denmark
 2009, „Гаси Америку“ (Russian translation of „Завладяването на Америка“), Russia

Honors
In 1994, Poshtakov received the Eurocon award for his collection „Дежурство на Титан“ (A Duty on Titan) in Timișoara, Romania.

External links
Brief overview of Khristo Poshtakov's role in Bulgarian SF
Several English translations of Poshtakov's short stories

1944 births
Bulgarian male short story writers
Bulgarian novelists
Male novelists
Bulgarian male writers
Bulgarian writers
Bulgarian translators
Translators from English
Translators from Russian
Translators from Spanish
Translators to Bulgarian
Living people
People from Pavlikeni
20th-century Bulgarian novelists
20th-century Bulgarian writers
20th-century Bulgarian short story writers
21st-century Bulgarian writers
21st-century Bulgarian novelists
21st-century Bulgarian short story writers